Song of America is a 3-disc, compilation album comprising 50 songs related to the history of America. Released on September 18, 2007 under Split Rock Records/Thirty One Tigers, the music collection was conceived by former U.S. Attorney General Janet Reno and musician Ed Pettersen (who is married to Reno's niece).

Track listing
Disc 1
 "Lakota Dream Song", performed by Earl Bullhead – 3:08
 "Once More Our God Vouchsafe to Shine", performed by Julie Lee – 3:07
 "Let Us Break Bread Together", performed by The Blind Boys of Alabama – 3:49
 "God Save the King", performed by John Wesley Harding – 3:49
 "Young Ladies in Town", performed by Elizabeth Foster – 3:01
 "The Old Woman Taught Wisdom", performed by Malcom Holcombe – 6:30
 "The Liberty Song", performed by Ed Pettersen – 4:59
 "Yankee Doodle", performed by Harper Simon – 3:29
 "Jefferson & Liberty", performed by The Wilders – 2:10
 "Hail Columbia", performed by Steven Kowalczyk-Santoro – 2:56
 "The Star Spangled Banner", performed by Take 6 – 2:04
 "Sometimes I Feel Like a Motherless Child", performed by Beth Nielsen Chapman – 5:09
 "Peg & Awl", performed by Freedy Johnston – 4:34
 "Sweet Betsy From Pike", performed by BR549 – 4:23
 "Trail of Tears", performed by Will & Jehnean – 4:35
 "Declaration of Sentiments", performed by Minton Sparks/Pat Flynn – 4:34
 "Go Down Moses", performed by Fisk Jubilee Singers – 3:44
 "Dixie's Land", performed by The Mavericks, featuring Thad Cockrell – 6:13

Disc 2
 "John Brown's Body", performed by Marah – 2:40
 "Battle Hymn of the Republic", performed by Joanna Smith – 5:15
 "Johnny I Hardly Knew Ye", performed by Janis Ian – 2:09
 "Thousands Are Sailing to Amerikay", performed by Tim O'Brien – 4:24
 "The Farmer is the Man", performed by Otis Gibbs – 3:03
 "Home On the Range", performed by Joni Harms – 4:30
 "Stars and Stripes Forever", performed by Jake Shimabukuro – 2:28
 "Sleep, My Child (Schlof Mayn Kind)", performed by Judith Edelman and Neilson Hubbard – 4:47
 "Over There", performed by Jen Chapin – 2:31
 "How You Gonna Keep 'Em Down On the Farm", performed by Andrew Bird – 5:04
 "Lift Every Voice and Sing", performed by Karen Parks – 5:11
 "Happy Days Are Here Again", performed by Danielson – 3:05
 "Brother Can You Spare a Dime?", performed by Andy Bey – 6:30
 "Seven Cent Cotton and Forty Cent Meat", performed by Jim Lauderdale – 2:11
 "Deportee (Plane Wreck at Los Gatos)", performed by Old Crow Medicine Show – 4:56
 "Rosie the Riveter", performed by Suzy Bogguss – 2:31
 "Reuben James", performed by Folk Family Robinson – 4:04

Disc 3
 "The Great Atomic Power", performed by Elizabeth Cook and The Grascals – 2:45
 "Little Boxes", performed by Devendra Banhart – 4:08
 "The Times They Are a-Changin'", performed by The Del McCoury Band – 3:49
 "Apache Tears", performed by Scott Kempner – 3:42
 "Get Together", performed by Kim Richey – 4:01
 "Say It Loud - I'm Black and I'm Proud", performed by The Dynamites with Charles Walker – 4:32
 "Ohio", performed by Ben Taylor – 2:40
 "What's Going On", performed by Anthony David – 5:02
 "I Am Woman", performed by Martha Wainwright – 3:27
 "Youngstown", performed by Matthew Ryan – 4:14
 "Wave," performed by Gary Heffern and Chris Eckman – 4:35
 "The Message", performed by Shortee – 6:34
 "Streets of Philadelphia", performed by Bettye LaVette – 3:49
 "Where Were You When the World Stopped Turning", performed by The Wrights – 5:30
 "This Land is Your Land", performed by John Mellencamp – 4:10

Personnel

Peter Abbott – Percussion, backing vocalist
Brad Albetta – producer, instrumentation
Jack Ashford – vibraphone
Bob Babbitt – bass
Mike Bailey – drums
Devendra Banhart – acoustic guitar, vocals
Kevin Barker – acoustic guitar, electric guitar
Will Barrow – piano
Alan Bartram – bass
Tom Bee – producer
Andy Bey – piano, vocals
David Bielanko – arranger
Serge Bielanko – guitar, arranger, backing vocalist
Andrew Bird – violin, arranger, electric guitar, vocals, whistle (human)
Leo Black – guitar, arranger, producer, horn arrangements
Suzy Bogguss – vocals
Jimmy Bowland – horn, saxophone
BR549 – arranger
Earl Bullhead – arranger, vocals
Andy Cabic – backing vocalist
Jason Carter – fiddle
Vincent Chancey – French horn
Jen Chapin – vocals, producer
Beth Nielsen Chapman – arranger, vocals, producer, gut string guitar, bazouki
Ernest Chapman – steel guitar, backing vocalist
Alvin Chea – vocals
Larry Ciancia – drums
Vinnie Ciesielski – horn
Thad Cockrell – arranger, vocals
Elizabeth Cook – vocals, producer
Stephan Crump – bass, producer
Anthony David – acoustic guitar, vocals, backing vocalist
Scott Davis – assistant engineer
Mickey Dawes – drums
Paul Deakin – arranger, drums
Cedric Dent – vocals
Tyrone Dickerson – organ
Chris Eckman – producer, engineer, performer, choir arrangement
Judith Edelman – acoustic guitar, arranger, vocals
Terry Eldredge – acoustic guitar, vocals
Betse Ellis – fiddle, arranger, producer
Rich Feaster – engineer, mixing
Curtis Fields – tenor (vocal)
Pat Flynn – guitar, arranger
Elizabeth Foster – arranger
Brian Fulk – engineer
Critter Fuqua – vocals, button accordion
Noah Georgeson – backing vocalist
Otis Gibbs – acoustic guitar, arranger, vocals
Steve Gluzband – trumpet
Janja Gomboc – choir, chorus
Ranger Doug Green – vocals
Ed Greene – percussion, drums
Paul Hammond – mastering
John Wesley Harding – arranger, vocals
Joni Harms – arranger, vocals
Otto Hauser – drums, backing vocalist
David R. Hayden – tenor (vocal)
Kevin Hayes – guitjo
Gary Heffern – vocals, assistant project coordinator
Don Herron – banjo, fiddle, mandolin, backing vocalist
Donnie Herron – fiddle
Alan Hill – keyboards
Will Hill – Native American flute, cultural advisor, language consultant, spoken word
Malcolm Holcombe – acoustic guitar, vocals
Ericson Holt – keyboards
Neilson Hubbard – bass, arranger, glockenspiel, keyboards, backing vocalist, producer
Scotty Huff – acoustic guitar
Carter William Humphrey – engineer
David Hungate – bass
Andy Hunt – backing vocalist, mixing, Ngawang Chopel
Shirley Hutchins – administration
Kenny Hutson – guitar, mandolin
Janis Ian – arranger, vocals, producer
Jack Irwin – engineer
Morgan Jahnig – bass (upright)
Erick Jaskowiak – engineer
Freedy Johnston – guitar, arranger, vocals, backing vocalist
Herb Jordan – producer
Nick Kane – electric guitar
Scott Kempner – bass, guitar, vocals
Joel Kibble – vocals
Mark Kibble – vocals, engineer
Craig King – piano, arranger
Jason Kourkounis – arranger, drums
Dave Kowalski – engineer
Viktor Krauss – bass
Paul T. Kwami – musical direction
Jim Lauderdale – banjo, vocals
Bettye LaVette – vocals
Julie Lee – vocals, baritone ukulele
David Leonard – mixing
Kimberly Levitan – design
David Macias – compilation producer
Paul Mahern – engineer
Joe Martino – assistant engineer
Catherine Styron Marx – keyboards
Rogers Masson – mixing
Jimmy Mattingly – fiddle
Josiah Mazzaschi – engineer
Mac McAnally – producer
Del McCoury – guitar, vocals, producer
Rob McCoury – banjo
Ronnie McCoury – mandolin, producer
Country Joe McDonald – vocals, penny whistle
Jerry Dale McFadden – keyboards
Claude V. McKnight III – vocals
Eamon McLoughlin – strings
Chuck Mead – guitar, vocals
John Mellencamp – guitar, vocals, producer
Mark "Guitar" Miller – bass
Rob Mitchell – drums
John Mock – tin whistle
Patrick Murphy – engineer
Tim O'Brien – fiddle, guitar, arranger, vocals
Bob Olhsson – engineer, mastering, mixing, compilation producer
Karen Parks – vocals
Chris "Chris P" "PowerTool" Patterson – percussion
Marcelo Pennell – engineer, mixing
Dave Peterson – drums
Ed Pettersen – bass, guitar, percussion, piano, arranger, keyboards, theremin, vocals, backing vocalist, producer, engineer, liner notes, mixing, compilation producer
Walker Pettibone – drums
Dirk Powell – engineer
Valerie Pringle – backing vocalist
Jonathan Quarmby – Hammond organ, producer, mixing
Lorne Rall – bass
Andy Reis – guitar, electric guitar
Robert Reynolds – bass, arranger
Kim Richey – acoustic guitar, vocals, backing vocalist
Peter Robbins – engineer, mixing
Todd Robbins – engineer, mixing
Danny Roberts – mandolin
Rich Robinson – guitar, vocals
Stan Robinson – vocals
Marcus Rojas – tuba
Michael Rubin – producer
Matthew Ryan – keyboards, vocals
Aaron Sands – bass
Pat Sansone – acoustic guitar, piano, engineer
Tamara Saviano – project manager
David Saw – guitar
Ketcham Secor – vocals, bajo sexto
Danny Seward – backing vocalist
Ike Sheldon – guitar
Jake Shimabukuro – arranger, ukulele
Scott Shipley – multiple instruments
Harper Simon – bass, guitar, arranger, vocals, producer
Paul Sinclair – mastering
Elin K. Smith – vocals
Mindy Smith – backing vocalist
Minton Sparks – arranger, vocals
Garrison Starr – backing vocalist
David Talbot – banjo
Christopher Thomas – bass
David Thomas – vocals
Wesley Trigg – tenor (vocal)
Ted Velykis – arranger, bass guitar
Wanda Vick – banjo, fiddle, mandolin
Philip Wade – mandolin
Martha Wainwright – vocals, backing vocalist
Charles E. Walker – vocals
M. Warren – arranger
Willie Watson – guitar, vocals
Kenzie Wetz – fiddle, vocals, backing vocalist
Willy Will – producer, engineer
Mark Wilson IV – bass
Adam Wright – guitar, vocals
Kirk Yoquelet – percussion, drums
Kate York – backing vocalist

References

2007 compilation albums
Concept albums
Works about American history